Lozotaenia cedrivora is a species of moth of the family Tortricidae. It is found in Algeria.

The larvae feed on Cedrus atlantica.

References

	

Moths described in 1990
Archipini